Denise Marie Newlove (born 2 February 1973) is a former Scottish international cricketer. Born in Patea, a small town in the Taranaki region of New Zealand, she debuted for the Scottish national side in June 2000. Newlove's  One Day International (ODI) debut came the following year, at the 2001 European Championship. The tournament was Scotland's first at ODI level, and Newlove played in all three of her team's matches, against England, Ireland, and the Netherlands. She scored only a single runs from three innings, in what were her only international appearances.

References

External links
 Denise Newlove at CricketArchive
 Denise Newlove at ESPNcricinfo

1968 births
Living people
New Zealand emigrants to the United Kingdom
New Zealand women cricketers
People from Patea
Scotland women One Day International cricketers
Scottish women cricketers